Campino may refer to:

 Campino (profession), a Portuguese cattle herder 
 Campino (candy), a brand of hard candy
 Campino (singer) (born 1962), the stage name of German singer Andreas Frege
 Campino (Burgos), a locality in Alfoz de Bricia, Province of Burgos, Spain 
 Enrique Campino (1794–1874), Chilean politician
 Giovanni Campino (Giovanni di Filippo del Campo, 1600–1648), Flemish Baroque painter mostly working in Italy

See also 
 António Campinos, Portuguese civil servant and current President of the European Patent Office
 Campinho (disambiguation)
 Campina (disambiguation)